is a 2019 visual novel social deduction role-playing game developed by Petit Depotto. It was originally released in June 2019 for the PlayStation Vita, and was ported to the Nintendo Switch in December 2020, with a Windows version released in January 2022.

Gameplay
This game uses a visual novel role-playing game format mixed with an RNG social deduction game. It is single player and utilizes a timeloop structure to create new situations. Aboard a spaceship, the player and several NPCs must deduce who on board is a Gnosia, an alien-like creature that will kill the regular humans on board. The player works with the NPCs to suss out and nominate the potential Gnosia suspects and put them into cryo-sleep. The player can also be Gnosia, in which case they know the other Gnosia on board and will work together to try to eliminate the humans. The number of Gnosia as well as the number of NPCs on board as well as the player's role, is determined prior to each loop beginning. In addition to regular humans and Gnosia, there are other roles, including the Doctor (who can investigate the recently frozen NPCs and determine if they were human or not), the Engineer (who can investigate non-frozen characters to determine if they are human), the Guardian Angel (who can protect high-risk targets from elimination by the Gnosia), and the Bug (who is essentially playing for themselves, trying to stay alive to the end of the round and seizing victory for themselves, destroying the universe). 

Throughout playing these loops the player will encounter many events with the other characters, which provides additional backstory to them as well as the universe they are in. In order to get to the ending of the game, the player must encounter all of these events first, many of which are locked behind a specific set of parameters for each loop. The game allows for an "event search" function on the ruleset screen, which lets you make it more likely to run into the events triggering.

Plot
In the far future, humanity has become a massive spacefaring civilization. However, one threat it must deal with is the Gnosia Plague, where people who have been infected with the Gnosia Plague feel compelled to murder other humans in the name of their god Gnos. 

The player character manages to get a ride on a refugee ship escaping from a planet being ravaged by the Gnosia Plague. However, during the trip to another planet, the ship's computer LeVi detects Gnosia infection on board the ship and following protocol, instructs the passengers and crew to deduce which one of them is the Gnosia before the Gnosia kills all of the humans and the ship is forced to self destruct. However, the player quickly discovers that regardless of the outcome of the investigation, time loops back to the initial discovery of the Gnosia infection. The player also discovers one of the passengers, Setsu, has also been trapped in a series of time loops and they both agree to collaborate to figure out to escape their loops.

However, when time loops, the conditions are not always identical, as the number of humans and Gnosia can change as well as the identity of the Gnosia. Later, the player even gains the ability to manually adjust the settings for each loop as they play through numerous different scenarios. Eventually, the player learns from the shrine maiden Yuriko that Gnos is actually a collective hivemind of "cyberised" humans who uploaded their minds to an electronic database and use the Gnosia as a means to add more minds to their collective. Yuriko also points out that the player themselves are an anomaly, since the ship only finds out the Gnosia infection since the player is supposed to be the Gnosia's first victim, meaning the player has been looping to timelines where they have already died. Scientist Raqio also eventually reveals that the player and Setsu's time loops are caused by an entity called the "Silver Key", which attach themselves to humans and gather data through the time loops they experience. Once the Silver Key collects enough information, it leaves to a different universe to continue its life cycle. 

After enough loops and unique scenarios, the player will finally gather enough data to fill up their Silver Key. They then loop to a timeline where nobody on the ship was infected by the Gnosia. The player's Silver Key then opens a portal. In order to prevent a time paradox, Setsu decides to take that loop's still hibernating version of the player through the portal. In addition, Setsu's own Silver Key has not been filled yet, and somebody needs close the portal from the other side. The player is forced to part ways with Setsu and returns to the rest of the passengers and crew, who celebrate having escaped the Gnosia Plague but have completely forgotten Setsu's existence. 

In the game's true ending, the player decides to follow Setsu to the other universe by starting a new game file. Setsu is shocked, but welcomes the player's help, as Setsu's Silver Key has now filled up thanks to the player's arrival, meaning Setsu's time loop can be closed now as well. Setsu uses knowledge gained from other time loops to discover the identity of the Gnosia, Manan, before she can claim any victims. Knowing that Manan desires immortality, Setsu tempts her with the Silver Key by pointing out she can use it to loop time endlessly. Manan agrees to take Setsu's Silver Key and is transported to another universe. Now having broken free from their respective time loops, the player and Setsu finally take a moment to relax together without having to worry about the future.

Development

Gnosias development first began in 2015 by four-person indie studio Petit Depotto. It was originally planned for the PlayStation Mobile, but was in announced in 2017 instead announced to be developed for the PlayStation Vita. Mebius released the game in Japan for the PlayStation Vita on June 6, 2019, and Petit Depotto self-published a Japanese Nintendo Switch version the following year on December 17, 2020. The Nintendo Switch version was published internationally in English on March 4, 2021 by Playism. A Microsoft Windows version was released on January 23, 2022 in English, Japanese, and Chinese, following a delay from 2021.

Reception

Gnosia received generally positive reviews from video game critics. It received a score of 82 on MetaCritic based on 39 reviews, ranging from a perfect 100 from Digitally Downloaded to a 40% from Switch Brasil. Mollie Patterson of Electronic Gaming Monthly praised the game's single-player adaptation of a typically multiplayer affair, stating: "arguing against the computer in an attempt to determine who is the human-killing alien in your group is far more dynamic and exciting than you’d ever expect this type of game to be." Nintendo Life's Trent Cannon found joy in the "clever, varied game design," deeming it perfect for both short or long gaming sessions.

Heidi Kemps of GameSpot offered both compliments and criticisms, lauding Gnosia's "intriguing story that slowly reveals its truths, keeping you interested in coming back for more," while lamenting the lack of character dialogue during discussions. Heather Johnson Yu of HeyPoorPlayer echoed Kemps' sentiments, both negative and positive, with a glowing addition that Gnosia was "my contender for GOTY 2021." The limited dialogue options were a dealbreaker for Igor Rangel of Switch Brasil, who considered the immersion "shallow" and suggested voice acting to offset the response issues.

Notes

References

External links

2019 video games
Nintendo Switch games
Playism games
PlayStation Vita games
Role-playing video games
Single-player video games
Social deduction video games
Video games about time loops
Video games developed in Japan
Visual novels
Windows games